Max Friedrich William Bezzel (4 February 1824 – 30 July 1871) was a German chess composer who created the eight queens puzzle in 1848.

External links
 Biography (in German) of Max Bezzel

1824 births
1871 deaths
Chess composers
19th-century chess players